1157 is the first and only live album by Australian country rock music group Stars. The album was recorded at Bombay Rock in Melbourne in October 1979 and released in July 1980, following band member Andrew Durant's death on 6 May 1980.
The album peaked at number 46 on the Australian charts, remaining on the chart for 8 weeks.

Track listing

Charts

References

1980 live albums
Stars (Australian band) albums
Mushroom Records live albums
Live albums by Australian artists